Gordon H. “Nick” Mueller (born 1940 Philadelphia) is an American historian and Founding President and CEO Emeritus of The National WWII Museum.

Career 
He studied at the University of Vienna, and graduated from the University of North Carolina. He taught at  University of New Orleans.

He was Vice Chancellor at the University of New Orleans.

He is credited, along with Stephen E. Ambrose, with starting the National WWII Museum, located in New Orleans, in 2000. Mueller served as President of the museum until 2017. A few years after its founding, the museum gained US Congressional support, and an affiliation with the Smithsonian Institution. He was the closest friend of Stephen Ambrose.

Selected publications

References

External links 

 
 

Living people
1940 births
Recipients of the Legion of Honour
University of Vienna alumni
University of North Carolina alumni
American expatriates in Austria
University of New Orleans faculty
American historians